Mohammad Haghani is an Iranian reformists activist who served as a member of the City Council of Tehran.

He was appointed as the acting Mayor of Tehran on 19 February 2002.

References

 Biography

1943 births
Living people
Mayors of Tehran
Tehran Councillors 2013–2017